The Bloukrans River (Grahamstown) is a tributary of the Kowie River, and is situated near Grahamstown in the Eastern Cape province of South Africa.

See also
 List of rivers of South Africa

Rivers of the Eastern Cape